Tomasi Vuetilovoni, commonly known as Tom Vuetilovoni, is a former Fijian politician, who was Minister for Tourism and Transport in 2006, following the parliamentary election held on 6–13 May that year.  Previously, he served as Minister for Commerce, Business Development, and Investment from July 2000, when he joined the interim government that was formed in the wake of the failed Fiji coup of 2000.  In the election held to restore democracy in September 2001, Vuetilovoni won the Ra Fijian Communal constituency for the Soqosoqo Duavata ni Lewenivanua (SDL), and retained his Cabinet post subsequently.

The military coup of 5 December 2006 ended Vuetilovoni's career in the Cabinet.

References

I-Taukei Fijian members of the House of Representatives (Fiji)
Living people
Soqosoqo Duavata ni Lewenivanua politicians
Government ministers of Fiji
Politicians from Ra Province
Year of birth missing (living people)